Mary Gabriel Gill (22 June 1837 – 22 April 1905) was a New Zealand catholic prioress. She was born in Dublin, County Dublin, Ireland on 22 June 1837.

References

Christian clergy from Dublin (city)
1837 births
1905 deaths
Irish emigrants to New Zealand (before 1923)
19th-century New Zealand people